Professor Duncan Munro Glen (11 January 1933 – 20 September 2008) was a Scottish poet, literary editor and Emeritus Professor of Visual Communication at Nottingham Trent University. He became known with his first full-length book, Hugh MacDiarmid and the Scottish Renaissance. His many verse collections included from Kythings and other poems (1969), In Appearances (1971), Realities Poems (1980), Selected Poems 1965–1990 (1991), Selected New Poems 1987–1996 (1998) and Collected Poems 1965–2005 (2006). His Autobiography of a Poet appeared with Ramsay Head Press in 1986. He edited Akros magazine for 51 numbers from August 1965 to October 1983. His work to promote Scottish poets and artists included Hugh MacDiarmid and Ian Hamilton Finlay, among others. Some of his poetry was translated into Italian.

Early life and career
Glen was born in Westburn, Cambuslang, South Lanarkshire, Scotland, the son of a white-collar worker in The Steel Company of Scotland, Hallside, near Newton Station. He was educated at West Coats Primary School in Cambuslang, then at Rutherglen Academy, but left at 15 to become an office boy and apprentice printer in Glasgow and Kirkcaldy, before studying at Edinburgh College of Art. After national service in the RAF as a photographic interpreter, he became a typographic designer with the HMSO and did freelance typographic design for publishers in London.

Glen then moved into graphic-design education, first at Watford College of Technology. After a brief spell as an editor in Glasgow with Robert Gibson & Sons Ltd, educational publishers, at what was to become Preston Polytechnic, he was appointed Professor of Visual Communication at what would be Nottingham Trent University. Glen served on the Council of National Academic Awards.

Glen founded Akros Publications in 1965, to publish Scottish poetry and literary criticism; from 1965 to 2006 over 250 works appeared under the Akros imprint. They included poetry, critical and historical studies, Akros magazine and Zed 2 0 (19 numbers), and fiction by Robert McLellan, John Herdman and others. His aim as editor of Akros magazine was to publish modern Scottish poetry in Scots and English, cutting across the "fighting cliques" of the time. Alongside his own poetry, he produced several studies of Scottish literature, anthologies, and a range of publications in other areas, including a history of typography, the definitive history of Cambuslang, a place for which he retained a affection, and an illustrated history of Kirkcaldy, where he latterly lived.

Glen was elected a Fellow of the Chartered Society of Designers in 1977. In 1974 and 1998 he received awards from the Scottish Arts Council "for services to Scottish literature" and "in recognition of his many years as a publisher and editor and entrepreneurial activities for Scottish literature". In 1991 he received the Howard Sergeant Memorial Award "in recognition of long and devoted services to poetry". In 2000 he was awarded the Honorary Degree of Doctor of Letters by Paisley University.

Bibliography
Works and anthologies produced by Duncan Glen, to be found in the National Library of Scotland and the British Library:
21 poems after drawings, etc. by George Hollingworth, et al., 2000
Antigruppo Palermo, gruppoanti, 1974
Apprentice angel/Hugh MacDiarmid, 1963
Autobiography of a poet, 1986
Bibliography of Scottish poets from Stevenson to 1974 compiled with an introduction by Duncan Glen with a preface by Hugh MacDiarmid, 1974
Bonnie fechter [sound recording]: Alexander Scott 1920–1989, 1990
Bright they shine: Cambuslang poetry/by Patrick Hamilton... et al.; with an introduction by Duncan Glen, 2001
 and wellies, or, Sui generis a sequence of poems by Duncan Glen with illustrations by George Hollingworth, 1976
Christmas fable for Margaret Duncan Glen
Cled score poems Duncan Glen, 1974
Clydesdale a sequence o poems by Duncan Glen, 1971
Clydeside kinsfolk: the lives and times of a typically extended Lowland *Scottish family 1694 to 1994: Cambuslang, *Rutherglen & East Kilbride/by Duncan Glen, 1995
Collected poems, 1965–2005/by Duncan Glen, 2006
Echoes: frae classical and Italian poetry/by Duncan Glen, 1992
Elegies: a selection from 1966–2003/by Duncan Glen, 2006
Essay in response to critical essays on contemporary Scottish poetry in Akros magazine/George Bruce; edited by Duncan Glen, 2005
European poetry in Scotland an anthology of translations edited by Peter France & Duncan Glen, 1989
Evergreen song lyrics : a selection from the poetry of the British Isles & America/chosen by Duncan Glen with commentaries, 2000
Extended Glen family of Cambuslang, Lanarkshire, Scotland & their descendants 1694–1998/by Duncan Glen, 1998
Familiar epistles between William Hamilton of Gilbertfield in Cambuslang and Allan Ramsay in Edinburgh: with an extract from William Hamilton of Gilbertfield's version of Blind Harry's Wallace/edited with an introduction by Duncan Glen; with prefaces by R. K. D. Milne and Neil McCallum, 2000
Feres poems by Duncan Glen, 1971
Five literati an anon (Scot lit. anti lit. pop) symposium created by Duncan Glen, 1976
Follow! Follow! Follow! and other poems by Duncan Glen, 1976
Forward from Hugh MacDiarmid, or, Mostly out of Scotland being fifteen years of Duncan Glen, Akros Publications 1962–1977 by Duncan Glen with a check-list of publications, August 1962 – August 1977, 1977
Four Scottish poets of Cambuslang & Dechmont Hill, 1626–1990: Patrick Hamilton, Minister at Cambuslang 1626–1645, Lieutenant William Hamilton of Gilbertfield, Cambuslang [c. 1665–1751], John Struthers, born at East Kilbride, and poet of Dechmont [1776–1850 and Duncan Glen, 1996
Friars of Berwick: a narrative poem in Scots, edited with an introduction by Duncan Glen, 2002
Gaitherings poems in Scots by Duncan Glen, 1977
Geeze! a sequence of poems by Duncan Glen, 1985
Graphic lines, 1975
Historic Fife Murders at Falkland, St. Andrews & Magus Muir: journeys through Fife between Forth and Tay/by Duncan Glen, 2002
Hugh Glen and the Victoria Drinking Fountain, Cambuslang: a family memoir, 2005
Hugh MacDiarmid & Duncan Glen: a prospect from Brownsbank: poems, biographical notes and a bibliography, 1998
Hugh MacDiarmid, a critical survey edited by Duncan Glen, 1972
Hugh MacDiarmid, an essay for 11 August 1977
Hugh MacDiarmid and the Scottish Renaissance, 1964
Hugh MacDiarmid, or, Out of Langholm and into the World
Hugh MacDiarmid: rebel poet and prophet. A short note on the occasion of his seventieth birthday, 1962
Illustrious Fife: literary, historical & architectural pathways & walks, 1998
In appearances, 1971
In place of wark, or, Man of art: a sequence in thirty pairts, 1977
In search of Serif Books, the Stanley Press & Joseph Mardel, publisher of Maurice Lindsay's Hurlygush and Sydney Goodsir Smith's Under the Eildon tree, & taking serious note of William Maclellan & Callum Macdonald: with photographs and illustrations, 2006
In the small hours, or, To be about to be a poem in thirty parts, 1984
Individual and the twentieth-century Scottish literary tradition, 1971
Inextinguishable part 14 of realities poems, 1977
Ither sangs, 1978
John Atman and other poems; with an introduction by Leonard Mason, 2001
Journey into Scotland: poems, 1991
Journey past – a sequence of poems, 1971
Keepsake for New Year 2000 from Akros Publications: poems, 2000
Kirkcaldy: a new illustrated history, 2004
Kirkcaldy: a photographic guide and introduction to the history of the town, 2005
Lanark & the Falls of Clyde...: Lanarkshire past and present, a rediscovery & anthology, 2001
Literary masks of Hugh MacDiarmid. [Illustrated], 1964
Long Calderwood, old East Kilbride; and its associations with John & William Hunter and the poetry of Anne Hunter, Joanna Baillie & John Struthers, with a selection of poems by Anne Hunter and Joanna Baillie, 2005
Makars' walk. Walks in the old town of Edinburgh, with an anthology of poetry selected and walked by Duncan Glen, 1990
Morning taken with the sun : an anthology of poems in short shining stanzas/[selection and design, Duncan Glen], 2001
Mr & Mrs J. L. Stoddart at home, a poem by Duncan Glen, 1975
Nation in a parish: a new historical prospect of Scotland from the parish of Cambuslang, 1995
New history of Cambuslang, 1998
Nottingham: a poem, 1984
Nuova poesia Scozzese/[edited by] Duncan Glen, [translated by] Nat Scammacca, 1976
Nuova Scozia : undici poesie di Duncan Glen/scelte e tradotte dallo scozzese da Enzo Bonventre, 1996
Of marks & memories : a gallimaufry of printers', publishers' and others' marks, devices, emblems, crests, arms, symbols or logos, 2005
Of philosophers and tinks. A sequence of poems, 1977
On midsummer evenin merriest of nichts? 1981
Orchardlands & Avondale & Bothwell...: Lanarkshire past and present, a rediscovery & anthology, 2001
Out to the Calf of Man, September 1989: a poem and etchings, 1990
Photographic celebration at the ruins of Bighty Farm, 2002
Poems in Scots Hugh MacDiarmid [edited by Duncan Glen], 1963
Poems on art works: a selection by Duncan Glen, 2003
Poetry of the Scots: an introduction and bibliographical guide to poetry in Gaelic, Scots, Latin and English, 1991
Poets & paintings : reinterpretations: an essay, 2003
Preston Polytechnic poets : Duncan Glen, Ian Harrow, Philip Pacey, Hugh Probyn/edited by Duncan Glen ; with illustrations by John Hodkinson, 1977
Preston's new buildings by John Brook and Duncan Glen with photographs by Myra Jones and John Brook, 1975
Printing type designs : a new history from Gutenberg to 2000, 2001
Querencia: saggio di traduzione poetica/Enzo Bonventre, 1994
Ravenscraig Castle: with illustrations of Pathhead, Sinclairtown & Dysart, 2001
Realities poems by Duncan Glen, 1980
Robert Louis Stevenson and the Covenanters on the Bass Rock & 'The tale of Tod Lapraik', 2002
Ruined rural Fife churches/photographed and introduced by Duncan Glen, with a selection of photographs of other ruined buildings, 2002
Ruins of Newark Castle, St. Monans, autumn 2002/introduced and photographed by Duncan Glen, 2003
Scottish literary periodicals: three essays/David Finkelstein, Margery Palmer McCulloch, Duncan Glen, 1998
Scottish literature: a new history from 1299 to 1999, 1999
Scottish poetry now as seen from London by Simon Foster, 1966
Seasons of delight: an anthology of poems on gardens, flowers, greenwoods & the sea/compiled and edited by Duncan Glen & Margaret Glen, 1998
Selected elegies: poems with photographs/by Duncan Glen, 2001
Selected essays of Hugh MacDiarmid edited with an introduction by Duncan Glen, 1969
Selected new poems: nineteen-eighty-seven to nineteen-ninety-six, 1998
Selected poems 1965–1990, 1991
Selected Scottish and other essays/by Duncan Glen; with an introduction by John Herdman, 1999
Seventeen poems, 1997
Situations – a sequence of poems by Duncan Glen with illustrations by Derek Carruthers, 1984
Something of the night and of the sun/[selection and design, Duncan Glen] 2001
Splendid Lanarkshire: past and present: a rediscovery and anthology of prose & verse/written and compiled by Duncan Glen, 1997
Spoiled for choice poems by Duncan Glen, 1976
The State of Scotland, a poem by Duncan Glen, 1983
Stevenson's Scotland/edited by Tom Hubbard & Duncan Glen, 2003
Stones of time. A sequence of poems by Duncan Glen, 1984
Sunny summer Sunday afternoon in the park? 1969
Tales to be told – poems by Duncan Glen, 1987
Ten bird sangs by Duncan Glen, 1978
Ten sangs by Duncan Glen, 1978
Ten sangs of luve by Duncan Glen, 1978
"This is no can of beans": a prospect from the window of a small-press publisher by Duncan Glen], 1999
Three/trittico translators of poems by Duncan Glen: Nat Scammacca, Enzo Bonventre, Marco Scalabrino: Scots and English, Italiano and Siciliano, 2001
Traivellin man. A sequence of poems by Duncan Glen with frontispiece by John Hodkinson, 1977
Trittico scozzese : Duncan Glen, J. K. Annand, Hugh MacDiarmid/cura e traduzione dallo Scots di Enzo Bonventre; traduzione in siciliano di Marco Scalabrino, 2001
Turn of the earth a sequence of poems by Duncan Glen, 1985
Twenty of the best: [and one more for good measure]: a Galliard anthology of contemporary Scottish poetry/edited by Duncan Glen ; with drawings by Alfons Bytautas, 1990
Unnerneath the bed/a poem by Duncan Glen, 1970
Upper Clydesdale...: Lanarkshire past and present, a rediscovery & anthology/by Duncan Glen, 2001
Weddercock; or, Tale of the ill-taen caller at Easter Greenlees Ferm on 3 August 1910 a poem by Duncan Glen, 1976
Whither Scotland? a prejudiced look at the future of a nation. Edited by Duncan Glen, 1971
William Maclellan's Scottish journal/images chosen and introduced by Duncan Glen, 2004
William Williamson: Kirkcaldy architect by Duncan Glen, 2008
Winter: a poem: and other verses/by James Thomson; edited with an introductory essay by Duncan Glen, 2002

Reviews
N. S. Thompson, 1980, review of Realities Poems: Cencrastus No. 4, Winter 1980–1881, p. 40, 
Cairns Craig, 1984, Lourd on My Hert, which includes a review of The State of Scotland: A Poem. Sheila G. Hearn, ed., Cencrastus'' No. 15, New Year 1984, pp. 54 and 55,

References

1933 births
2008 deaths
Scottish magazine editors
Scottish scholars and academics
Alumni of the Edinburgh College of Art
Academics of the University of Central Lancashire
Academics of Nottingham Trent University
People from Cambuslang
People educated at Rutherglen Academy
British literary editors
20th-century Scottish poets
Scottish male poets
20th-century British male writers